Garcinia microcarpa, also known as kandis hutan, is a species of flowering plant, a dioecious understorey fruit tree in the mangosteen family, that is native to Southeast Asia.

Description
The tree grows to 10–20 m in height, with a 5–10 m bole, oozing yellowish latex when cut. The smooth oval leaves are 12–18 cm long by 6–8 cm wide. The inflorescences occur along the branches. The fruits are round berries, 3–3.5 cm by2.3–2.5 cm in diameter; the epicarp is greenish with pale brown patches, with white latex, enclosing 6–8 cream-coloured seeds covered with a translucent, sweet and edible arillode.

Distribution and habitat
The species is endemic to Borneo, where it is found in Sabah and Sarawak in lowland and hill mixed dipterocarp forest up to an elevation of 900 m.

References

 

microcarpa
Endemic flora of Borneo
Fruits originating in Asia
Plants described in 1883
Taxa named by Jean Baptiste Louis Pierre